Parks on the Air (POTA) is an amateur radio operating award program started in 2010 with its nonprofit organization being founded in 2018 that encourages amateur radio operators to operate in a variety of parks and public lands as a portable station. Activations can take place during other events such as Field Day. The POTA movement saw a large surge of interest in 2016 after the ARRL hosted  a one year activation event called NPOTA. The event was created to help celebrate the 100th anniversary of the National Park System and was designed to encourage amateur radio operators to transmit from within National Parks. POTA  has been a popular method of community and student outreach, with events taking place in parks and sometimes during other public events. The organization has worked to spread to countries outside the United States including the Caribbean and India.

Amateur radio operators who set up stations at a park are known as activators, and other amateur radio operators who complete contacts with them are called hunters. There are awards given out to both activators and hunters based on a wide range of criteria including awards for the total number of contacts, contacts made on each amateur radio band, and for different modes of communication.

References 

Amateur radio operating awards
Amateur radio